The Animals' Christmas is the sixth post-Simon & Garfunkel studio album and the first Christmas album by vocalist Art Garfunkel, and is a collaborative album with Amy Grant, released in October 1986 by Columbia Records. The album was written by Jimmy Webb and features vocals by Garfunkel, Grant, and Wimbledon King's College Choir. The Animals' Christmas tells the story of the Nativity of Jesus from the perspective of the animals present. The album received positive reviews, with one writer calling it "one of the best Christmas albums of the '80s." The album failed to chart.

Background
During the early 1980s, Jimmy Webb began writing the songs that would become The Animals' Christmas, based on a children's book about the Nativity of Jesus by Anne Thaxter Eaton. Garfunkel became interested in the project because he felt it was "born out of the love of a musical person to make music." In his 1989 book, Still Water: Prose Poems, Garfunkel wrote about his experience with the project.

Production
The Animals' Christmas was recorded between December 23, 1984 and December 12, 1985. The orchestra was recorded at CTS Studios in Wembley, England. The boys' choir was recorded at St. Paul's Church in Southfields, South-west London, England. Vocals were recorded at Air Studios in Montserrat, West Indies. Amy Grant's vocals were recorded at Bullet Recording in Nashville, Tennessee. The organ was recorded at the Cathedral of St. John the Divine in New York City. Overdubs were recorded at The Hit Factory in New York City.

Packaging and artwork
The original album contained a 12-page booklet with lyrics in four languages: English, Spanish, French, and German. The album cover art was created by Abby Levine.

Critical reception

Writer David A. Milberg called  the album "one of the best Christmas albums of the '80s."

Track listing
All songs were written by Jimmy Webb, except where indicated.

"The Annunciation" – 2:38
"The Creatures of the Field" – 2:31
"Just a Simple Little Tune" – 2:54
"The Decree" – 3:25
"Incredible Phat" – 4:59
"The Friendly Beasts" (Traditional, Jimmy Webb) – 3:24
"The Song of the Camels" (Elizabeth Coatsworth, Jimmy Webb) – 2:46
"Word from an Old Spanish Carol" – 3:41
"Carol of the Birds" – 2:00
"The Frog" – 5:15
"Herod" – 4:21
"Wild Geese" – 3:33

Personnel
Music

 Art Garfunkel – vocals, producer, remixing
 Amy Grant – vocals
 Jimmy Webb – piano, producer, composer, arranger
 Carl Davis – conductor
 Michael Jenkins – choir director
 London Symphony Orchestra – orchestra
 King's College School Choir – choir, chorus
 Stephen Bayly – vocals
 Del Costello – vocals
 Nicholas Dykes – vocals
 Jonathan Jenkins – vocals 
 Michael Lee - vocals
 Paul Halley – Hammond organ
 Rob Mounsey – synthesizer
 Elliott Randall – electric guitar
 Eric Weissberg – banjo, acoustic guitar
 George Young – saxophone
 Joe Osborn – bass guitar
 Steve Gadd – drums
 Gordon Gottlieb – percussion

Production

 Geoff Emerick – producer, engineer, remixing
 Roy Halee – engineer
 Jon Kelly – engineer
 Stuart Breed – assistant engineer, remixing
 Nicole Graham – remixing
 Greg Calbi – mastering
 Elizabeth Coatsworth – composer, text
 Anne Thaxter Eaton – compilation
 Christopher Austopchuk – art direction
 Abby Levine (www.abbyart.com) – artist

References

1985 Christmas albums
Amy Grant albums
Art Garfunkel albums
Albums arranged by Jimmy Webb
Albums produced by Jimmy Webb
Christmas albums by American artists
Columbia Records Christmas albums
Vocal duet albums
Christmas cantatas
Pop Christmas albums
Albums produced by Geoff Emerick
Concept albums